Yoon Sang-hyun (born September 21, 1973) is a South Korean actor and singer. He is best known for his roles in Queen of Housewives (2009), My Fair Lady (2009), Secret Garden (2011) and I Can Hear Your Voice (2013).

Career
Yoon Sang-hyun made his show business debut relatively late at age 32, in the 2005 television series Marrying a Millionaire. This was followed by forgettable supporting roles, until his breakout as the immature chaebol Tae-bong in Queen of Housewives in 2009. Later that year, he was cast in his first lead role as a rich woman's butler in My Fair Lady.

In early 2010, Yoon released the Japanese single Saigo no Ame ("The Last Rain"), which debuted at 11th place on the Oricon Chart. He released his second single Oath on June 24.

This was followed by hit TV series Secret Garden with Kim Sa-rang, in which he played the protagonist's cousin and Hallyu star Oska. He released a single titled "Looking at U" for the soundtrack of the drama.

In 2011, he released his Japanese debut studio album Precious Days, followed by concerts and showcases in Tokyo (February 25, 2011) and Osaka (February 27, 2011), which sold out after only one day. He then starred in romantic comedy Can't Lose, about a lawyer couple facing their own divorce suit.

Yoon appeared in his first major film role in 2012's Tone-deaf Clinic (released internationally as Love Clinique), playing a vocal coach who gives a tone-deaf woman voice lessons so that she can sing well in front of her crush.

In 2013, he returned to the small screen with the popular series I Can Hear Your Voice, playing a well-meaning but bumbling cop-turned-public defender. He later reunited with the director of I Can Hear Your Voice in the 2014 cable drama Gap-dong, in which he played a detective out to capture a serial killer and clear his father's name. He then starred in the comedy film, My Dynamite Family.

In 2016, Yoon starred in the romantic comedy drama My Horrible Boss. He starred in another rom-com the same year, playing the second lead role in Shopaholic Louis.

In 2017, Yoon starred in the mystery black-comedy drama, Ms. Perfect.

In 2018, Yoon starred in the melodrama Let's Look at the Sunset Holding Hands alongside Han Hye-jin.

In 2020 he appeared in 18 Again  a television series based on the 2009 film 17 Again opposite Kim Ha-neul.

Personal life
Yoon married singer MayBee (Kim Eun-ji) on February 8, 2015 at the Walkerhill Hotel in Seoul. A day later, they released the duet Balsam Colors to commemorate the occasion, with sales from the digital single going to charity. The couple became engaged in November 2014 after eight months of dating. The couple's first daughter Na-gyeom was born in December 2015, while their second daughter was born in May 2017.

Filmography

Television series

Film

Variety show

Discography

Commercials

Awards and nominations

Listicles

References

External links
 
 

1973 births
Living people
Dongguk University alumni
South Korean male film actors
South Korean male television actors
Sony Music Entertainment Japan artists